Lauren Eduarda Leal Costa (born 13 September 2002), simply known as Lauren, is a Brazilian professional footballer who plays as a centre-back for Spanish Liga F club Madrid CFF and the Brazil women's national team.

Club career
Lauren has played for AD Centro Olímpico and São Paulo in Brazil.

International career
Lauren represented Brazil at the 2018 South American U-17 Women's Championship and the 2020 South American Under-20 Women's Football Championship. She made her senior debut on 20 September 2021.

Honours

International
Brazil U20
South American Under-20 Women's Football Championship: 2022

References

2002 births
Living people
Footballers from São Paulo (state)
Brazilian women's footballers
Women's association football central defenders
Associação Desportiva Centro Olímpico players
São Paulo FC (women) players
Madrid CFF players
Campeonato Brasileiro de Futebol Feminino Série A1 players
Primera División (women) players
Brazil women's international footballers
Brazilian expatriate women's footballers
Brazilian expatriate sportspeople in Spain
Expatriate women's footballers in Spain